Zodarion segurense is a spider species found in Spain.

See also 
 List of Zodariidae species

References

External links 

segurense
Spiders of Europe
Spiders described in 1994